
Gmina Polanów is an urban-rural gmina (administrative district) in Koszalin County, West Pomeranian Voivodeship, in north-western Poland.

Villages
Apart from the town of Polanów, Gmina Polanów contains the villages and settlements of Bagnica, Bartlewo, Bożenice, Bukowo, Buszyno, Cetuń, Chocimino, Chocimino Leśne, Chróstowo, Czarnowiec, Czyżewo, Dadzewo, Dalimierz, Doły, Domachowo, Dzikowo, Garbno, Gilewo, Głusza, Gołogóra, Gosław, Gostkowo, Jacinki, Jaromierz Polanowski, Jeżewo, Kania, Karsina, Karsinka, Kępiec, Kępiny, Kierzkowo, Knieja, Komorowo, Kopaniec, Kościernica, Krąg, Krytno, Łąkie, Lipki, Liszkowo, Łokwica, Małomierz, Mirotki, Młyniska, Nacław, Nadbór, Nowy Żelibórz, Osetno, Piaskowo, Pieczyska, Pokrzywno, Powidz, Przybrodzie, Puławy, Pyszki, Racibórz Polanowski, Racław, Rekowo, Rochowo, Rosocha, Rzeczyca Mała, Rzeczyca Wielka, Rzyszczewko, Samostrzel, Smugi, Sowinko, Stare Wiatrowo, Stary Żelibórz, Stołpie, Strzeżewo, Świerczyna, Szczerbin, Trzebaw, Warblewo, Wielin, Wietrzno, Zagaje, Żdżar, Zdzieszewo and Żydowo.

Neighbouring gminas
Gmina Polanów is bordered by the gminas of Biały Bór, Bobolice, Kępice, Malechowo, Manowo, Miastko, Sianów and Sławno.

References
Polish official population figures 2006

Polanow
Koszalin County